Bertha Peak is a  mountain summit located in Waterton Lakes National Park, in the Canadian Rockies of Alberta, Canada. It is situated behind the Waterton townsite. Its nearest higher peak is Mount Alderson,  to the southwest. Bertha Lake lies at the southern foot of the peak, with Mount Richards on the opposite side of the lake. Mount Crandell lies to the north.

History

Bertha Peak was named by Morrison P. Bridgland in 1914 after Bertha Ekelund (1898–1962), a wayward woman and early resident of Waterton who gained notoriety for trying to pass counterfeit money. Morrison P. Bridgland (1878–1948), was a Dominion Land Surveyor who named many peaks in the Canadian Rockies.

The mountain's name was officially adopted in 1953 by the Geographical Names Board of Canada.

Geology
Like other mountains in Waterton Lakes National Park, Bertha Peak is composed of sedimentary rock laid down during the Precambrian to Jurassic periods. Formed in shallow seas, this sedimentary rock was pushed east and over the top of younger Cretaceous period rock during the Laramide orogeny.

Climate
Based on the Köppen climate classification, Bertha Peak is located in a subarctic climate zone with cold, snowy winters, and mild summers. Temperatures can drop below −20 °C with wind chill factors below −30 °C. Precipitation runoff from Bertha Peak drains into Waterton Lake,  thence Waterton River.

See also
Geology of Alberta

Gallery

References

External links
 Bertha Peak weather forecast
 Parks Canada web site: Waterton Lakes National Park

Two-thousanders of Alberta
Waterton Lakes National Park
Canadian Rockies